The 1980 OFC Nations Cup was held in Nouméa, New Caledonia. The eight participating teams were Australia, Fiji, New Caledonia, New Hebrides, New Zealand, Papua New Guinea, the Solomon Islands, and Tahiti. Australia defeated Tahiti 4-2 in the final to secure a championship title which would last for 16 years. The hosts, New Caledonia, defeated Fiji to finish third.

Venues

Group stage

Group A

Group B

Knockout stage

Third place

Final

Champions Squad
Coach:  Rudi Gutendorf

Notes and references

External links
 Oceania Football
 rec.sports.soccer Statistics Foundation 1980 Oceania Cup results. Accessed 21 February 2010.

 
1980
1980
Nations
1980 in New Caledonia
1980 in New Zealand association football
1980 in Australian soccer
February 1980 sports events in Oceania
March 1980 sports events in Oceania